Only the Brave is a 1930 American Pre-Code Civil War drama film directed by Frank Tuttle and starring Gary Cooper, Mary Brian, and Phillips Holmes.

Written by Agnes Brand Leahy, Edward E. Paramore Jr., Keene Thompson, and Richard H. Digges Jr., the film is about a Union Army captain who travels into Confederate territory as a spy with false dispatches hoping to mislead the Confederate forces. His mission is complicated when he falls in love with a southern woman who comes to his aid. Produced by Hector Turnbull for Paramount Pictures, Only the Brave was released on March 8, 1930 in the United States.

Plot
During the American Civil War, Capt. James Braydon (Gary Cooper) visits his sweetheart and finds her with another man. Angered by the betrayal, he volunteers to become a spy for the Union. His first assignment involves carrying false military dispatches behind enemy lines and allow them to be discovered by Confederate Army officers in order to mislead them. Braydon sets off on his dangerous mission.

Pretending to be a Confederate sympathizer in possession of vital Union plans, Braydon arrives at the plantation of a beautiful southern belle, Barbara Calhoun (Mary Brian), who has organized a ball for Confederate officers. At the ball, Braydon openly flirts with his gracious host in order to make one of the Confederate officers, Capt. Robert Darrington (Phillips Holmes), jealous. Darrington is in love with Barbara, and Braydon believes that if he can make him jealous, he will be arrested and his fraudulent dispatches will be discovered. Braydon's plan is disrupted, however, by Barbara who comes to his defense, and soon falls in love with him.

In the coming days, Barbara continues to save Braydon from being arrested, even after she discovers that he is a Union spy. Each time he attempts to get arrested, she intervenes and arranges for his release. Finally, Braydon leaps from a window and is captured by the Confederates, who discover the fraudulent dispatches and soon act on them. Later, after they discover that the dispatches were a deception, they order Braydon executed by firing squad. Just before the sentence can be carried out, the Union Army arrives, and in the subsequent battle, Braydon is saved, although seriously wounded. Barbara is there to comfort him.

Sometime later, after General Lee surrenders at Appomattox Court House to end the war, Barbara and Braydon are married in a military wedding.

Cast
 Gary Cooper as Capt. James Braydon 
 Mary Brian as Barbara Calhoun 
 Phillips Holmes as Capt. Robert Darrington 
James Neill as Vance Calhoun
Morgan Farley as Lt. Tom Wendell
 Guy Oliver as Gen. U.S. Grant 
John Elliott as Gen. Robert E. Lee
E. H. Calvert as The Colonel
Virginia Bruce as Elizabeth
Elda Voelkel as Lucy Cameron
William Le Maire as The Sentry
Freeman Wood as Elizabeth's Lover
Lalo Encinas as Gen. Grant's Secretary

Production
Only the Brave was filmed at Paramount Studios at 5555 Melrose Avenue in Hollywood, Los Angeles, California. The films stars, Gary Cooper and Mary Brian, also appeared together in The Virginian (1929).

Critical response
Only the Brave received positive reviews upon its theatrical release. In the Reading Eagle, the reviewer wrote that Cooper's performance in the film was "far better" than his "previously satisfactory best" in The Virginian. The reviewer continued:

The reviewer also felt that Mary Brian was effective in reprising her role as Cooper's love interest, as she did in The Virginian.

References

External links
 
 
 

1930 films
1930s American films
1930s English-language films
1930s historical films
American black-and-white films
American Civil War films
American historical films
Films directed by Frank Tuttle
Films scored by John Leipold
Paramount Pictures films